The House of Stuart, originally spelt Stewart, was a royal house of Scotland, England, Ireland and later Great Britain. The family name comes from the office of High Steward of Scotland, which had been held by the family progenitor Walter fitz Alan (c. 1150). The name Stewart and variations had become established as a family name by the time of his grandson Walter Stewart. The first monarch of the Stewart line was Robert II, whose male-line descendants were kings and queens in Scotland from 1371, and of England, Ireland and Great Britain from 1603, until 1714. Mary, Queen of Scots, was brought up in France where she adopted the French spelling of the name Stuart.

In 1503, James IV married Margaret Tudor, thus linking the royal houses of Scotland and England. Elizabeth I of England died without issue in 1603, and James IV's great-grandson (and Mary's only son) James VI of Scotland succeeded to the thrones of England and Ireland as James I in the Union of the Crowns. The Stuarts were monarchs of Britain and Ireland and its growing empire until the death of Queen Anne in 1714, except for the period of the Commonwealth between 1649 and 1660.

In total, nine Stewart/Stuart monarchs ruled Scotland alone from 1371 until 1603, the last of whom was James VI, before his accession in England. Two Stuart queens ruled the isles following the Glorious Revolution in 1688: Mary II and Anne. Both were the Protestant daughters of James VII and II by his first wife Anne Hyde and the great-grandchildren of James VI and I. Their father had converted to Catholicism and his new wife gave birth to a son in 1688, who was to be brought up as a Roman Catholic; so James was deposed by Parliament in 1689, in favour of his daughters. However, neither daughter had any children who survived to adulthood, so the crown passed to the House of Hanover on the death of Queen Anne in 1714 under the terms of the Act of Settlement 1701 and the Act of Security 1704.

After the loss of the throne, the descendants of James VII and II came to be known as the Jacobites and continued for several generations to attempt to reclaim the Scottish and English (and later British) throne as the rightful heirs, though since the early 19th century there have been no more active claimants from the Stuart family. The current Jacobite heir to the claims of the historical Stuart monarchs is Franz, Duke of Bavaria, of the House of Wittelsbach. The senior living member of the royal Stewart family, descended in a legitimate male line from Robert II of Scotland, is Arthur Stuart, 8th Earl Castle Stewart.

Background 
The ancestral origins of the Stuart family are obscure—their probable ancestry is traced back to Alan FitzFlaad, a Breton who went to England not long after the Norman conquest. Alan had been the hereditary steward of the Bishop of Dol in the Duchy of Brittany; Alan had a good relationship with Henry I of England who awarded him with lands in Shropshire. The FitzAlan family quickly established themselves as a prominent Anglo-Norman noble house, with some of its members serving as High Sheriff of Shropshire. It was the son of Alan named Walter FitzAlan who became the first hereditary High Steward of Scotland, while his brother William's family went on to become Earls of Arundel.

When the civil war in the Kingdom of England, known as The Anarchy, broke out between the legitimist claimant Matilda, Lady of the English, and her cousin who had usurped her, King Stephen, Walter had sided with Matilda. Another supporter of Matilda was her uncle David I of Scotland from the House of Dunkeld. After Matilda was pushed out of England into the County of Anjou, essentially failing in her legitimist attempt for the throne, many of her supporters in England fled also. It was then that Walter followed David up to the Kingdom of Scotland, where he was granted lands in Renfrewshire and the title for life of Lord High Steward. The next monarch of Scotland, Malcolm IV, made the High Steward title a hereditary arrangement. While High Stewards, the family were based at Dundonald, South Ayrshire, between the 12th and 13th centuries.

History 

The sixth High Steward of Scotland, Walter Stewart (1293–1326), married Marjorie, daughter of Robert the Bruce, and also played an important part in the Battle of Bannockburn gaining further favour. Their son Robert was heir to the House of Bruce, the Lordship of Cunningham and the Bruce lands of Bourtreehill; he eventually inherited the Scottish throne when his uncle David II died childless in 1371.

In 1503, James IV attempted to secure peace with England by marrying King Henry VII's daughter, Margaret Tudor. The birth of their son, later James V, brought the House of Stewart into the line of descent of the House of Tudor, and the English throne. Margaret Tudor later married Archibald Douglas, 6th Earl of Angus, and their daughter, Margaret Douglas, was the mother of Henry Stuart, Lord Darnley. In 1565, Darnley married his half-cousin Mary, Queen of Scots, the daughter of James V. Darnley's father was Matthew Stewart, 4th Earl of Lennox, a member of the Stewart of Darnley branch of the House. Lennox was a descendant of Alexander Stewart, 4th High Steward of Scotland, also descended from James II, being Mary's heir presumptive. Thus Darnley was also related to Mary on his father's side and because of this connection, Mary's heirs remained part of the House of Stuart. Following John Stewart of Darnley's ennoblement for his part at the Battle of Baugé in 1421 and the grant of lands to him at Aubigny and Concressault, the Darnley Stewarts' surname was gallicised to Stuart.

Both Mary, Queen of Scots, and Lord Darnley had strong claims on the English throne through their mutual grandmother Margaret Tudor. This eventually led to the accession of the couple's only child James as King of Scotland, England, and Ireland in 1603. However, this was a personal union, as the three Kingdoms shared a monarch, but had separate governments, churches, and institutions. Indeed, the personal union did not prevent an armed conflict, known as the Bishops' Wars, breaking out between England and Scotland in 1639. This was to become part of the cycle of political and military conflict that marked the reign of Charles I of England, Scotland and Ireland, culminating in a series of conflicts known as the War of the Three Kingdoms. The trial and execution of Charles I by the English Parliament in 1649 began 11 years of republican government known as the English Interregnum. Scotland initially recognised the late King's son, also called Charles, as their monarch, before being subjugated and forced to enter Cromwell's Commonwealth by General Monck's occupying army. During this period, the principal members of the House of Stuart lived in exile in mainland Europe. The younger Charles returned to Britain to assume his three thrones in 1660 as "Charles II of England, Scotland and Ireland" - with the support of General Monck - but dated his reign from his father's death eleven years before.

In feudal and dynastic terms, the Scottish reliance on French support was revived during the reign of Charles II, whose own mother was French. His sister Henrietta married into the French royal family. Charles II left no legitimate children, but his numerous illegitimate descendants included the Dukes of Buccleuch, the Dukes of Grafton, the Dukes of Saint Albans and the Dukes of Richmond.

These French and Roman Catholic connections proved unpopular and resulted in the downfall of the Stuarts, whose mutual enemies identified with Protestantism and because James VII and II offended the Anglican establishment by proposing tolerance not only for Catholics but for Protestant Dissenters. The Glorious Revolution caused the overthrow of King James in favour of his son-in-law and his daughter, William and Mary. James continued to claim the thrones of England and Scotland to which he had been crowned, and encouraged revolts in his name, and his grandson Charles (also known as Bonnie Prince Charlie) led an ultimately unsuccessful rising in 1745, ironically becoming symbols of conservative rebellion and Romanticism. Some blame the identification of the Roman Catholic Church with the Stuarts for the extremely lengthy delay in the passage of Catholic emancipation until Jacobitism (as represented by direct Stuart heirs) was extinguished; however it was as likely to be caused by entrenched anti-Catholic prejudice among the Anglican establishment of England. Despite the Whig intentions of tolerance to be extended to Irish subjects, this was not the preference of Georgian Tories and their failure at compromise played a subsequent role in the present division of Ireland.

Present-day 
The Royal House of Stuart became extinct with the death of Cardinal Henry Benedict Stuart, brother of Charles Edward Stuart, in 1807. Duke Francis of Bavaria is the current senior heir. However, Charles II had a number of illegitimate sons whose surviving descendants in the male line include Charles Gordon-Lennox, 11th Duke of Richmond; Henry FitzRoy, 12th Duke of Grafton; Murray Beauclerk, 14th Duke of St Albans; and Richard Scott, 10th Duke of Buccleuch. In addition, James II's illegitimate son, James FitzJames, 1st Duke of Berwick, founded the House of FitzJames comprising two branches, one in France and one in Spain. The last of the French branch died in 1967; the senior heir of James II's male-line descendants is Jacobo Hernando Fitz-James Stuart, 20th Duke of Peñaranda de Duero.

List of monarchs

Monarchs of Scotland

Monarchs of England, Scotland and Ireland 

From the Acts of Union 1707, which came into effect on 1 May 1707, the last Stuart monarch, Anne, became Queen of Great Britain and Ireland.

<div style="overflow:auto">

Family tree

Round provided a family tree to embody his essential findings, which is adapted below.

Origin

 

 Alan fitz Flaad
 William FitzAlan, Lord of Oswestry
  William Fitz Alan, 1st Lord of Oswestry and Clun
 William Fitz Alan, 2nd Lord of Oswestry and Clun
  John Fitzalan, Lord of Oswestry
  John FitzAlan, 6th Earl of Arundel
  House of FitzAlan
 Jordan fitz Alan, Seneschal of Dol
 Walter fitz Alan, 1st High Steward of Scotland
  Alan fitz Walter, 2nd High Steward of Scotland
  Walter Stewart, 3rd High Steward of Scotland
 Alexander Stewart, 4th High Steward of Scotland
 James Stewart, 5th High Steward of Scotland
  Walter Stewart, 6th High Steward of Scotland
Robert II of Scotland
  John Stewart of Ralston
  John Stewart of Bonkyll
 Alexander Stewart of Bonkyll
  Earls of Angus (extinct 1361)
 Alan Stewart of Dreghorn
  Stewart of Darnley
 Earls of Lennox
  Stewart of Garlies
 Earls of Galloway
 Stewart of Burray
 Stewart of Physgill (Phisgal)
 Stewart of Minto
  Lords Blantyre
 Stewart of Tongrie
  Stewart of Barclye
 Walter Stewart of Garlies and Dalswinton
  John Stewart of Dalswinton
  Walter Stewart of Garlies and Dalswinton
 James Stewart of Pearston
  Stewart of Pearston
 Stewart of Lorn
  Clan Stewart of Appin
 Earls of Atholl
  Earls of Buchan
  Earls of Traquair (illegitimate)
 John Stewart of Daldon
  Robert Stewart of Daldowie
 Walter Bailloch
  Earls of Menteith
  Robert Stewart, Lord of Darnley
  Simon fitz Alan
  Clan Boyd

House of Stewart

 Robert II of Scotland
 Robert III of Scotland
 David Stewart, Duke of Rothesay
  James I of Scotland
 Alexander Stewart, Duke of Rothesay
 James II of Scotland
 James III of Scotland
 James IV of Scotland
 James, Duke of Rothesay
 Arthur Stewart, Duke of Rothesay
 James V of Scotland
 James, Duke of Rothesay
 Arthur, Duke of Albany
  Mary, Queen of Scots
  Alexander Stewart, Duke of Ross
 James Stewart, Duke of Ross
  John Stewart, Earl of Mar
 Alexander Stewart, Duke of Albany
 Alexander Stewart, Bishop of Moray
  John Stewart, Duke of Albany
 David Stewart, Earl of Moray
  John Stewart, Earl of Mar
  Sir John Stewart (illegitimate)
  Stewart of Ballechin
 Walter, Lord of Fife
 Robert Stewart, Duke of Albany
 Murdoch Stewart, Duke of Albany
 Robert Stewart
 Walter Stewart
  Lords Avandale
  Lords Stuart of Ochiltree
  Barons Castle Stewart
  Earls Castle Stewart
 Alasdair Stewart
  James Mor Stewart
  James "Beag" Stewart (illegitimate)
  Stewart of Balquhidder
 Stewart of Ardvorlich
 Stewart of Glen Buckie
 Stewart of Gartnafuaran
  Stewart of Annat
 John Stewart, Earl of Buchan
  Robert Stewart, Earl of Ross
 Alexander Stewart, Earl of Buchan, the Wolf of Badenoch
  Illegitimate sons
  Stewart of Atholl
 David Stewart, Earl of Strathearn
 Walter Stewart, Earl of Atholl
 Alan Stewart, 4th Earl of Caithness
  David Stewart, Master of Atholl
  John Stewart, Sheriff of Bute (illegitimate)
  Clan Stuart of Bute

House of Stuart
Descended from the Stewarts of Darnley (Stewarts of Lennox)

 Henry Stuart, Lord Darnley, husband of Mary, Queen of Scots
  James VI and I
 Henry Frederick, Prince of Wales
 Charles I of England
 Charles II of England
 James Scott, 1st Duke of Monmouth (illegitimate)
  Dukes of Buccleuch
 Charles FitzCharles, 1st Earl of Plymouth (illegitimate)
 Charles FitzRoy, 2nd Duke of Cleveland (illegitimate)
  Dukes of Cleveland (extinct 1774)
 Henry FitzRoy, 1st Duke of Grafton (illegitimate)
  Dukes of Grafton
 George FitzRoy, 1st Duke of Northumberland (illegitimate)
 Charles Beauclerk, 1st Duke of St Albans (illegitimate)
  Dukes of St Albans
  Charles Lennox, 1st Duke of Richmond (illegitimate)
  Dukes of Richmond, Lennox and Gordon
 James II of England
 Charles Stuart, Duke of Cambridge
 James Stuart, Duke of Cambridge
 Charles Stuart, Duke of Kendal
 Edgar, Duke of Cambridge
 Charles Stuart, Duke of Cambridge
 James Francis Edward Stuart
 Charles Edward Stuart
  Henry Benedict Stuart
 James FitzJames, 1st Duke of Berwick (illegitimate)
  House of FitzJames
 Dukes of Berwick
  Dukes of Fitz-James (extinct 1967)
  Henry FitzJames (illegitimate)
  Henry Stuart, Duke of Gloucester
  Robert Stuart, Duke of Kintyre and Lorne

See also 
 Jacobitism, for more on the legitimist House of Stuart, following the Glorious Revolution
 John Barbour, the first Stewart court poet and genealogist
 List of Scottish monarchs
 List of British monarchs
 Clan Stewart
 Barony and Castle of Corsehill Stewarton in Ayrshire and the Stuart connection
 Armorial of the House of Stuart

Notes

References

Sources

Further reading 

 Addington, Arthur C. The Royal House of Stuart: The Descendants of King James VI of Scotland (James I of England). 3v. Charles Skilton, 1969–76.
 Cassavetti, Eileen. The Lion & the Lilies: The Stuarts and France. Macdonald & Jane's, 1977.

External links 

 Official website of the Stewarts of Argyll

 
Scottish monarchy
Medieval royal families
.
Royal houses of Britain
Scoto-Norman families
1370s establishments in Scotland